The Moscow International Biennale for Young Art (MIBYA) is a major contemporary visual art exhibition that focuses on the work of artists and curators under the age of 35. It aims to bring together new artistic initiatives from Russia and the world by supporting the creative development of young artists for interested audiences.  MIBYA was first held in 2008 in response to rising interest from artists, curators and critics following the festival of young art, "Qui Vive?" sponsored by the National Center for Contemporary Arts (NCCA) and held annually from 2002 to 2006, in collaboration with free workshops at the Moscow Museum of Modern Art (MMOMA). "The project has acquired new status thanks to growing interest from young artists, curators, and critics. Through the combined efforts of the NCCA and MMOMA, the biennial for young art was developed."

Participants are given the chance to establish connections and connect with the professional artistic community.

6th Moscow International Biennial For Young Art

The 6th Moscow International Biennial for Young Art was scheduled to begin on June 8, 2018. The curator of the main project is Lucrezia Calabrò Visconti, an independent curator from Italy. The theme of the event is "Abracadabra" with an emphasis on "the night out" and the "dance floor". Abracadabra is an archaic magical incantation with opaque origins.

Curator
Lucrezia Calabrò Visconti (Italy, 1990) is an independent curator based in Torino, where she co-founded the research-driven, non-profit space CLOG Projects, "a research-driven independent space with a focus on contemporary art and culture, autonomous education experiments and self-production projects."  Visconti previously worked as an artistic advisor for "Artissima" (Internazionale d'Arte Contemporanea) and as assistant curator for "Tutttovero" by Francesco Bonami and "Shit and Die" by Maurizio Cattelan, Myriam Ben Salah and Marta Papini. She writes for contemporary art journals and platforms, and founded the online projects "Curatorshit", "shitndie" and "Ketchup Drool". Her "Dear Betty: Run Fast, Bite Hard!" at GAMeC, Bergamo, was the winning project of Premio Bonaldi 2015–16.

Commissioner

Ekaterina Kibovskaya serves as commissioner of the project. She was born in Moscow and graduated from the journalism department of Moscow State University (media culture and communications laboratory). She worked at Esquire magazine as a manager in New York City with a number of artists and gallery owners. She was also commissioner of the 5th Moscow International Biennale for Young Art.

Founders and organizers
The founders of the biennale are Ministry of Culture of the Russian Federation, the Moscow Department of Culture, the National Centre for Contemporary Arts (NCCA) as part of the ROSIZO exhibition space and the Moscow Museum of Modern Art (MMOMA).

ROSIZO state museum and exhibition center develops and presents exhibition projects in partnership with other museums and cultural institutions. It hosts a collection of more than 40,000 artworks. 

Moscow Museum of Modern Art (MMOMA) is the first state Russian museum that concentrates exclusively on the art of the 20th and 21st centuries. One of the museum's priorities is to promote young and emerging artists, by bringing them into the contemporary artistic process, and to create inclusive projects.

References

 Art biennials